Trachypetinae is a subfamily of the parasitic wasp family Braconidae. The family Trachypetidae was erected in 2020 for three rare Australian genera of large parasitoid wasps formerly included in the Braconidae, but was reduced to a subfamily in 2022.

References

Apocrita families
Ichneumonoidea